John William Campbell may refer to:

Sir John Campbell, 1st Baronet, major-general in the British Army
John William Campbell (herbalist), Creole herbalist in Sierra Leone

See also
John Campbell (disambiguation)
William John Campbell, Creole mayor of Freetown, Sierra Leone
John W. Campbell (financier) (John Williams Campbell), American financier